Sherif El-Erian (born 28 November 1970) is an Egyptian modern pentathlete. He competed at the 1992 Summer Olympics.

References

1970 births
Living people
Egyptian male modern pentathletes
Olympic modern pentathletes of Egypt
Modern pentathletes at the 1992 Summer Olympics